Päite is a village in Toila Parish, Ida-Viru County in northeastern Estonia. It is located just west of the town of Sillamäe. As of 2011 Census, the settlement's population was 22, of which the Estonians were 11 (50.0%).

References

Villages in Ida-Viru County